Leonard Sydney Dawe (3 November 1889 – 12 January 1963) was an English amateur footballer who played in the Southern League for Southampton between 1912 and 1913, and made one appearance for the England national amateur football team in 1912. He later became a schoolteacher and crossword compiler for The Daily Telegraph newspaper and in 1944 was interrogated on suspicion of espionage in the run-up to the D-Day landings.

Early career
Dawe was born in Brentford in west London and was educated at Portsmouth Grammar School, before going up to Emmanuel College at the University of Cambridge. In his final year at the university, he earned his football "blue" when he played in the 1912 match against the University of Oxford, scoring in his side's 3–1 victory.

Football career
In March 1912, he signed on amateur terms for Southampton of the Southern League, making his debut in a 1–0 victory over Plymouth Argyle on 30 March. On his debut, he laid on the game's only goal for Percy Prince. The local daily paper, The Echo, reported that "Dawe was decidedly plucky to 'get in it'." Dawe always took the field wearing spectacles and one of his lenses was broken during his debut game.
 
Dawe continued to make occasional appearances for Southampton over the next twelve months, although his studies and teaching career prevented him from appearing more often. In his eleven league appearances for the "Saints", he scored three goals, including two against Watford on 13 April 1912.

Dawe was a member of the Great Britain squad for the 1912 Summer Olympics in Stockholm, Sweden, but was not selected to play. He did, however, make one appearance for the England national amateur football team when he played against Ireland in Belfast in October 1912.

By the end of the 1912–13 season, Dawe had severed his connection with Southampton and had joined Ilford in north-east London.

Teaching career
In 1913, Dawe obtained a teaching position (teaching science) at Forest School in the Walthamstow area of north-east London before joining St Paul's School based at Barnes. In 1926, he joined Strand School in the Tulse Hill area of south London, progressing to become the school's head teacher. Dawe was described as a "disciplinarian and a man of extremely high principle". At Strand School, he was known as "'moneybags", in allusion to his initials, L.S.D. (pounds, shillings and pence).

Military career
During World War I, Dawe was commissioned as a second lieutenant for service with the Forest School Officer Training Corps on 20 February 1915, transferring to the Hampshire Regiment "local reserve" on 9 May 1916. Whilst with the Hampshire Regiment, he served in the Mesopotamia campaign from September 1917.

After the war, he transferred as a lieutenant from a service battalion of the Hampshires to St Paul's School OTC on 29 April 1920, being promoted to major with St Paul's OTC on 25 August 1926, but resigned that commission on 16 October 1926.

Crossword compiler
In 1925, he commenced compiling crosswords for The Daily Telegraph newspaper and was one of the first compilers to use "cryptic" clues. The first Daily Telegraph crossword, compiled by Dawes, appeared on 30 July 1925 – he continued to compile crosswords until his death in 1963.

During the Second World War Strand School was evacuated to Effingham, Surrey. Dawe was living at Leatherhead in 1944.

The Dieppe and D-Day crosswords

In 1944, several codenames related to the D-Day plans, such as "Utah" and "Mulberry", appeared as solutions in Dawe's crosswords in The Daily Telegraph. The inclusion of the codewords was initially suspected by the British Secret Services to be a form of espionage, but it was determined that Dawe had got the words from boys at the school, who had overheard them from soldiers.

"Quest"
In 1992, Dawe's life was the basis for an album, "Quest", by the neo-progressive rock band, Final Conflict – the album is about an ordinary man like Dawe imagining he is on trial for the failings in his life.

References

External links
Untold Stories of D-Day

1889 births
1963 deaths
People from Brentford
Footballers from Brentford
People educated at The Portsmouth Grammar School
Alumni of Emmanuel College, Cambridge
English footballers
Association football forwards
Dulwich Hamlet F.C. players
Cambridge University A.F.C. players
Southampton F.C. players
Ilford F.C. players
Southern Football League players
England amateur international footballers
British Army personnel of World War I
Military personnel from London
Royal Hampshire Regiment officers
Crossword compilers
Operation Overlord
Schoolteachers from London
Gosport United F.C. players